Loh Kok Heng (born 6 June 1949) is a Singaporean former sports shooter. He competed in two events at the 1968 Summer Olympics.

References

External links
 
 

1949 births
Living people
Singaporean male sport shooters
Olympic shooters of Singapore
Shooters at the 1968 Summer Olympics
Shooters at the 1974 Asian Games
Asian Games competitors for Singapore
20th-century Singaporean people